"Celluloid Heroes" is a song performed by the Kinks and written by their lead vocalist and principal songwriter, Ray Davies. It debuted on their 1972 album Everybody's in Show-Biz.

The song names several famous actors of 20th century film, and also mentions Los Angeles's Hollywood Boulevard, alluding to its Hollywood Walk of Fame. The actors mentioned are Greta Garbo, Rudolph Valentino, Bela Lugosi, Bette Davis, Marilyn Monroe, George Sanders, and Mickey Rooney, although the verse mentioning the latter three is omitted in some recorded versions of the song (e.g. on One for the Road).

Background
An ode to classic Hollywood icons, "Celluloid Heroes" has since been singled out by Dave Davies as a standout track by the band: "One of my favorite songs ever, by anybody. I remember when we were just starting out down the road with tidying up the lyrics. That really filled me with a lot of emotion because it is quite an incredible idea anyway, all those [movie] stars, names and handprints being on those stars. There are all these great stars immortalized on pavement, in concrete."

Release and reception
The track was released as the second single from the album. In the UK, the single features the full album version which runs to over six minutes, but the US single used a more corporate-radio-friendly edit which is almost two minutes shorter. Although their previous single had been a top 20 hit on the UK Singles Chart, "Celluloid Heroes" failed to chart.

The song appears on the band's live album One for the Road (1980) and was re-recorded for the 2009 album The Kinks Choral Collection. The song was also the title track of a 1976 collection featuring material originally released while recording for the RCA label, The Kinks' Greatest: Celluloid Heroes.

Reviewing the live single, Record World called it "perhaps one of Ray Davies' finest compositions."

List of actors mentioned in the lyrics
 Greta Garbo
 Rudolph Valentino
 Bela Lugosi
 Bette Davis
 George Sanders
 Marilyn Monroe
 Mickey Rooney

Cover versions
Joan Jett recorded this song for her all-covers album The Hit List. 
A live performance of this track (featuring Ray Davies) appeared as the B-side to Bon Jovi's 2002 single "Misunderstood".
Steve Vai recorded a cover of this song on his album The Elusive Light and Sound Vol. 1.
British actor and singer Tim Curry frequently performed this song during his tours in the late 70s. 
Finnish singer-songwriter Juice Leskinen translated and recorded this song in Finnish as "Paperitähdet".
Renaissance-inspired folk rock band Blackmore's Night recorded the song for their album Autumn Sky.
The song appeared on Ray Davies' 2010 album See My Friends, featuring Jon Bon Jovi and Richie Sambora.
Australian actor Reg Livermore performs the song in his Betty Blokk-Buster Follies show, the song also appears on the soundtrack.
Australian singer Jeannie Lewis recorded the song on the 1974 album Looking Backwards to Tomorrow. There is YouTube footage of her performing the song on The Norman Gunston Show.
Pauly Shore covered the song on his YouTube channel in 2020.

References

1972 singles
The Kinks songs
Songs written by Ray Davies
Song recordings produced by Ray Davies
RCA Records singles
Songs about Los Angeles
Songs about actors
Hollywood, Los Angeles in fiction
Songs about Marilyn Monroe
Cultural depictions of Rudolph Valentino
Cultural depictions of Greta Garbo
Cultural depictions of Bela Lugosi